The Sea Birds Preservation Act 1869 (32 & 33 Vict. c. 17) was an Act of Parliament in the United Kingdom. It was the first Act to protect wild birds in that country.

History
In 1868, Professor Alfred Newton addressed the British Association for the Advancement of Science on the "On the Zoological Aspect of the Game Laws". In particular, he urged for protection of birds of prey and seabirds during the breeding season. The British Association appointed a committee to propose a close season. The committee consisted of Frank Buckland, Henry Eeles Dresser, William Bernhardt Tegetmeier and Henry Baker Tristram. James Edmund Harting was later co-opted onto the committee.

Newton's speech cited the destruction of seabirds on the Isle of Wight and Flamborough Head. Wide publicity of his speech led to public condemnation of the residents of Bridlington. Rev. Henry Frederick Barnes-Lawrence of Bridlington Priory held a meeting of local clergy and naturalists and formed the Association for the Protection of Sea-Birds. Barnes-Lawrence's Association had the support of Francis Orpen Morris, William Thomson, Archbishop of York, and local MP Christopher Sykes.

As with many animal welfare laws before 1900, the animals' safety was not the main reason for the act. Seabirds were useful to sailors to warn of land in bad weather. If a boat was in fog and the sailors could hear seabirds nearby then they would know that they were near land. If the population of seabirds declined then they would not have this early warning system.

The Act

The act was introduced by Christopher Sykes (MP), Mr Clay and Mr Ward Jackson on behalf of the Association for the Protection of Sea-Birds. It was designed to reduce the effects of shooting and egg collecting during the breeding season. It gave limited protection to "the different species of auk, bonxie, Cornish chough, coulterneb, diver, eider duck, fulmar, gannet, grebe, guillemot, gull, kittiwake, loon, marrot, merganser, murre, oyster catcher, petrel, puffin, razor bill, scout, seamew, sea parrot, sea swallow, shearwater, shelldrake, skua, smew, solan goose, tarrock, tern, tystey, willock".

See also
British Association for the Advancement of Science
British Ornithologists' Union
Conservation biology
Henry Eeles Dresser
Game Act 1831
James Edmund Harting
Francis Orpen Morris
Alfred Newton
Christopher Sykes (MP)
William Bernhardt Tegetmeier
William Thomson, Archbishop of York
Henry Baker Tristram

Footnotes

References
 Barclay-Smith, Phyllis (1959): The British contribution to bird protection Ibis 101(1):pp 115–122
 Greenoak, Francesca (1979): All the Birds of the Air Andre Deutsch, London

External links
Association for the Protection of Sea-Birds
Hansard: Sea Birds Preservation Bill, Leave
Hansard: Sea Birds Preservation Bill, Second Reading
Hansard: Sea Birds Preservation Bill, Consideration
Hansard: Sea Birds Preservation Bill, Lord's Committee

United Kingdom Acts of Parliament 1869
Bird conservation